Paddy Moore (4 August 1909 – 24 July 1951) was an Irish professional footballer who played for, among others, Shamrock Rovers and Aberdeen. Moore was a dual internationalist and played for both Ireland teams – the FAI XI and the IFA XI.

In February 1934 Moore scored four goals for the FAI XI in a World Cup qualifier against Belgium. As a result, he became the first player ever to score four goals in a World Cup game. However injury and alcoholism combined to blight both his career and life and he was only 41 when he died. In September 2006 Moore was posthumously honoured by Shamrock Rovers at their Legends Ball.

Club career 

As a youth Moore played for several teams including Richmond Rovers before joining Shamrock Rovers for the first of three spells. In 1929 at the age of 19 he signed for Cardiff City, but made only one appearance. After brief spells with both Merthyr Town and Tranmere Rovers he then returned to Shamrock Rovers. During the 1931–32 season he helped Rovers win both the League of Ireland championship and the League of Ireland Shield. He also helped Rovers win the FAI Cup in both 1931 and 1932, scoring in both finals.

After an impressive performance for the FAI XI against the Netherlands in May 1932, Moore, together with Joe O'Reilly and Jimmy Daly, was one of three Irish players from that team who were then signed by Aberdeen. The trio were signed for a combined fee of less than £1,000. Moore made an impressive start for Aberdeen, scoring 27 goals in 29 Scottish League matches during the 1932–33 season. However, in subsequent seasons his problems with alcoholism began to emerge.

In February 1934 the Aberdeen manager Paddy Travers accompanied Moore while on international duty against Belgium to help keep him away from alcohol. Travers was aware that Moore had developed a drink problem that would end his career prematurely. In May 1935 Moore was selected to play for the FAI XI in an away game against Switzerland but he was declared unfit to play after drinking too heavily while travelling to the game. Other similar incidents resulted in Moore being released by Aberdeen. Moore then returned to Shamrock Rovers and in 1936 helped them win a third FAI Cup by scoring in his third final.

Irish international 
When Moore began his international career in 1931 there were, in effect, two Ireland teams, chosen by two rival associations. Both associations, the Northern Ireland-based IFA and the Irish Free State-based FAI claimed jurisdiction over the whole of Ireland and selected players from the whole island. As a result, several notable Irish players from this era, including Moore, played for both teams.

FAI XI 
Between 1931 and 1936 Moore made 9 appearances and scored 7 goals for the FAI XI. He made his international debut for the FAI XI on 26 April 1931 against Spain. Together with Tom Farquharson, Peter Kavanagh, Jeremiah Robinson and Charlie Dowdall, Moore was part of an FAI XI that gained a respectable 1–1 draw at the Montjuic Stadium in Barcelona. Moore marked his debut by scoring the FAI XI's goal. He gave the visitors the lead in the 35th minute when he received a pass from John Joe Flood and then found himself in a one against one situation with the legendary Spanish goalkeeper, Ricardo Zamora. Moore coolly lobbed the ball over the advancing Zamora and into the back of the goal. The goalkeeper subsequently tore off his shirt in disgust and threw it into the back of the net, suffering the derision of his own fans.

Moore missed the return game against Spain due to injury, but then won his second FAI XI cap against the Netherlands on 5 May 1932. He scored the FAI XI's second goal in a 2–0 victory. Moore shot from twenty yards and bought the 30,000 crowd to their feet. However the highlight of Moore's international career came on 25 February 1934 at Dalymount Park when the FAI XI made their World Cup debut in a qualifier against Belgium. He scored all four goals for the FAI XI as they came from 2–0, 3–1 and then 4–3 down to draw 4–4. As a result, Moore became the first player ever to score four goals in a World Cup game. Two months later in another qualifier on 8 April 1934, Moore scored his seventh and last goal for the FAI XI in a 5–2 defeat against the Netherlands.

The other major highlight of Moore's international career came on 17 October 1936 when he masterminded the FAI XI in a 5–2 win against Germany, again at Dalymount Park. Despite not scoring himself, he helped set up four of the goals. He made his last appearance for the FAI XI on 6 December 1936 in 3–2 home defeat against Hungary.

IFA XI 
On 17 October 1932, while playing for Aberdeen, Moore made his one and only appearance for the IFA XI, in a game against England in Blackpool. Together with Jimmy Dunne, Jimmy Kelly and Harry Duggan, Moore was one of four players born in what is now the Ireland to feature in the IFA XI forward line. Although England won 1–0, the IFA selectors retained the same team for the game against Wales on 7 December. However injury prevented Moore from winning a second IFA XI cap and the 1932 game England remains the only time that Moore and Dunne played together at international level.

Coaching career 
During the 1940s Moore coached Stella Maris where he nurtured the talents of future Republic of Ireland international Ronnie Whelan, Sr. Legend has it, Whelan was initially spotted by Moore's wife, who then brought him to the attention of her husband.

Honours 

Shamrock Rovers

League of Ireland
Winners 1931–32: 1
FAI Cup
Winners 1931, 1932, 1936: 3
League of Ireland Shield
Winners 1931–32: 1
Leinster Senior Cup
Winners 1930, 1933: 2

Sources 
The Boys in Green – The FAI International Story (1997): Sean Ryan 

 The Hoops by Paul Doolan and Robert Goggins

References

External links 
Northern Ireland's Footballing Greats
  Paddy Moore bio and stats
The Ballad of Paddy Moore
 Shamrock Rovers website

1909 births
1951 deaths
Dual Irish international footballers
Irish Free State international footballers
Irish Free State association footballers
Pre-1950 IFA international footballers
Republic of Ireland association footballers
Shamrock Rovers F.C. players
Aberdeen F.C. players
Cardiff City F.C. players
Merthyr Town F.C. players
Tranmere Rovers F.C. players
Shelbourne F.C. players
League of Ireland players
Association footballers from County Dublin
League of Ireland XI players
Scottish Football League players
Stella Maris F.C.
Association football forwards
Irish expatriate association footballers
Irish expatriate sportspeople in Scotland
Expatriate footballers in Scotland